Barrymore Plus Four was a short-lived radio programme that aired from February to March 1995.  There were eight half-hour episodes and it was broadcast on BBC Radio 2.  It starred Michael Barrymore, Susie Blake, Robert Glenister, Harry Enfield, and Ted Robbins.

References 
 Lavalie, John. Barrymore Plus Four. EpGuides. 21 Jul 2005. 29 Jul 2005  <https://web.archive.org/web/20070612002232/http://epguides.com/BarrymorePlusFour/%3E.

BBC Radio 4 programmes
1995 radio programme debuts